The following lists events that happened during 1931 in the Union of Soviet Socialist Republics.

Incumbents
 General Secretary of the Communist Party of the Soviet Union – Joseph Stalin
 Chairman of the Central Executive Committee of the Congress of Soviets – Mikhail Kalinin
 Chairman of the Council of People's Commissars of the Soviet Union – Vyacheslav Molotov

Events

March
1–8 March – The 1931 Menshevik Trial is held.

April
27 April – 1931 Zangezur earthquake

Births
1 January – Anatoli Ivanovich Bogdanov, Olympic shooter (died 2001)
17 January – Yury Rudov, Olympic fencer (died 2013)
21 January – Tatjana Michaylovna Zacharova, production worker, author and politician
22 January – Galina Zybina, Olympic athlete
1 February – Boris Yeltsin, first President of Russia (died 2007)
2 March – Mikhail Gorbachev, last leader of the Soviet Union (died 2022)
13 March – Alisa Aksyonova, museum director
23 March – Yevdokiya Mekshilo, Olympic skier
29 March – Aleksei Gubarev, cosmonaut
27 April – Igor Oistrakh, Ukrainian violinist
25 May – Georgy Grechko, cosmonaut
25 June – Anatoli Georgievich Vitushkin, mathematician
27 June – Anatoli Ilyin, footballer
24 September – Mark Midler, Olympic fencer
28 September – Emma Yefimova, Olympic fencer
1 November – Dmitri Bashkirov, pianist (died 2021)
21 November – Revaz Dogonadze, Georgian physicist (died 1985)

Deaths 
23 January – Anna Pavlova, Russian ballerina, died in The Hague (born 1881)
15 August – Nigar Shikhlinskaya, first Azerbaijani nurse (born 1871 or 1878)

See also
1931 in fine arts of the Soviet Union
List of Soviet films of 1931

References

 
1930s in the Soviet Union
Years in the Soviet Union
Soviet Union
Soviet Union
Soviet Union